The Nikon D6 is a full frame professional DSLR camera announced by Nikon Corporation on February 11, 2020, to succeed the D5 as its flagship DSLR. It has a resolution of 20.8MP, like the D5. The D6 has a newer Expeed 6 processor that supports burst shooting at up to 14fps. It has 105 cross type focus points.

Features
While the D6 retains many features of the Nikon D5, it offers the following new features and improvements:
 Nikon EXPEED6 image processor
 Supports burst shooting at up to 14fps
 New Multi-CAM 37K autofocus sensor module with 105 focus points, all cross-type sensors
 Increasing continuous shooting speed to 14fps with full AF
 Dual CFexpress (Type B) card slots, compatible as well with XQD cards
 105 focus points all of which are cross points.
 Builtin WiFi and Bluetooth
 Support for GNS systems: GPS, GLONASS, QZSS
 Exposure up to 900 seconds

Uses

See also
Nikon
Nikon D4s
Nikon D5

References

External links

 Official Nikon press release
 Nikon D6, Nikon

Cameras introduced in 2020
Full-frame DSLR cameras
Live-preview digital cameras
D6
D6